PZFlex is a commercial software package for finite element analysis and virtual prototyping, developed by Weidlinger Associates Inc, USA.  It was an outgrowth of the Flex family of codes developed for structural engineering.

The PZFlex code uses both Explicit and implicit methods. It is a time domain solver that specializes in large wave propagation problems, with emphasis on problems featuring electro-mechanical materials such as piezoelectric ceramics.

The explicit solver is designed to tackle both highly non-linear transient phenomena and quasi-static problems. The package is available for Windows and Linux platforms, both 32 and 64-bit systems.
It was developed in the later 1980s to meet the demands of the medical ultrasound imaging device industry and has been adopted for use in the automotive, aerospace, sonar, MEMs and Non-destructive testing industries.

It has also become popular with leading ultrasonic research groups in academia due to its flexibility and speed for solving large, complex problems.

PZFlex stands for PiezoElectric Fast, Large and EXplicit.

Products

PZFlex
The main product is PZFlex which is available in two packages: PZFlex Standard and PZflex Professional. These packages are available as a perpetual or annual license for both
Windows and Linux.

PZFlex Standard
Explicit time-domain solver
Thermo-mechanical solver
Large deformation solver
GPU Extrapolation

PZFlex Professional
Standard solvers
Piezoelectric solver
Electrostatic solver (CMUT)
PseudoSpectral solver

PZFlexCloud
PZFlexCloud extends the market reach and performance of PZFlex's award-winning engineering software by exploiting the power, elasticity, and ubiquity of the cloud.

Add-on Products
Several add-on products are available for PZFlex packages.
MIDAS FX+ Pre-processor
MPI solver
Steady-State flow solver
Additional cores
Additional licenses
Training
Technical support and maintenance
Floating Network License (FNL)

References

External links
PZFlex
PZFlexCloud
Weidlinger Associates Inc
Flex codes http://www.wai.com/softproducts.aspx

Finite element software
Finite element software for Linux
Simulation software